RheinEnergie can refer to:

RheinEnergie AG, energy company based in Cologne
RheinEnergieStadion, sports stadium in Cologne
Köln 99ers, formerly RheinEnergie Köln, defunct basketball club